Claudia Karvan  (born 19 May 1972) is an Australian actress, producer and scriptwriter. As a child actor, she first appeared in the film, Molly (1983) and followed with an adolescent role in High Tide (1987). She portrayed a teacher in The Heartbreak Kid (1993) – the film was spun off into a TV series, Heartbreak High (1994–1999), with her character taken over by Sarah Lambert. Karvan's roles in television series include The Secret Life of Us (2001–2005), Love My Way (2004–2007), Newton's Law (2017) and Halifax: Retribution (2020). She won Best Actress in a Leading Role in a Television Drama at the AFI Awards (later rebranded as the AACTA Awards) for her appearance in G.P. (1996). She won two similar AFI Awards for her role in Love My Way (2005 and 2007) and in 2014 for her work in The Time of Our Lives (2013–2014). As a co-producer and co-writer on Love My Way, she won three further AFI Awards for Best Drama Series in 2005, 2006 and 2007. Karvan was inducted into the Australian Film Walk of Fame in 2007 in acknowledgment of her contributions to the Australian film and television industry. From 2010 to 2011, she starred in the drama series Spirited, which she co-created and was executive producer. She appeared as Judy Vickers in Puberty Blues (2012, 2014). Karvan has co-produced House of Hancock (February 2015) and Doctor Doctor (2016–2021). In 2021 she co-created, co-produced and starred in the TV drama series, Bump.

Early years 

Claudia Karvan was born in Sydney on 19 May 1972. She grew up with her mother, Gabrielle Goddard, and two siblings. For primary school she attended Glenmore Road Public School, Paddington. Her surname comes from her stepfather, Arthur Karvan, who was the son of a Greek immigrant, George Karvouniares (1910–1972), who had Anglicised his surname to Karvan. At the "What Women Want" forum in September 2002 she discussed the refugee crisis and mandatory detention, "[George] came out here at 16 years of age – on his own – from an island in Greece. He did not speak any English. His first job was selling ice-cream and the Australian kids would throw sand into it... I remember feeling very sorry when I heard these stories and sorry that this was his introduction to Australia. But this all seems like child's play compared with being locked up in detention camps."

From the age of eight she spent a year living in Bali with her mother and two brothers. After returning to Australia, Karvan's family moved to King's Cross where her stepfather owned a restaurant and nightclub, Arthur's. Andrew Denton interviewed her on Enough Rope in March 2003, where she recalled, "It was great fun, drag queens everywhere and drunk adults. It was also like a home, because we lived across the road, so after school I'd come there, and it would be a hive of industry." She attended the Sydney Church of England Girls Grammar School (SCEGGS), "I went to SCEGGS, which was around the corner in Darlinghurst. And over the intercom they said, 'No girls are supposed to go beyond King's Cross Station any further down into Victoria Street.' That's where I live!... I do remember my street was out of bounds." AllMovie's Nathan Southern felt that, "Though she spent a short period dabbling in rebellious and somewhat edgy behavior, she remained inherently intellectual and heavily gravitated to literature as a primary source of fascination."

Career

Film

Karvan debuted in the children's film, Molly (1983), where she appeared as Maxie Ireland who befriends a talented dog, Molly. Eleanor Mannika of AllMovie reviewed it, "In this uneven children's story... [Molly's] new, young caretaker Maxie ([Karvan]) has her hands full because the villainous 'Old Dan'... [who] is such a sinister, psychotic type that the intended sense of adventure in the film is often no more than a sense of the macabre."

In 1987, she appeared in Phillip Noyce's Echoes of Paradise and then alongside Judy Davis in Gillian Armstrong's High Tide that same year. Paul Fischer of Tharunka described how, "virtually stealing the film is talented 14-year old, [Karvan]... she gives a vivid performance... [she] is brilliant in the demanding role, as she works beautifully with face and eyes to evoke various degrees of emotion. This young actor will do well in the future."

Karvan later reflected, "acting opposite Judy Davis, all the work's done for you. I remember her close-up was first and I was just bawling off camera... she's very powerful... I never look forward to [crying on screen]... [it] is a lot harder and a lot more, more confronting and lot more — You feel a lot more vulnerable. And I resist it." She received a nomination for AFI Award (Australian Film Institute Award) for Best Performance by an Actress in a Supporting Role (later re-titled AACTA Award for Best Actress in a Supporting Role) for her portrayal of Ally in High Tide but lost to Jan Adele, who depicted her grandmother, Bet, in the same film.

At 17-years-old Karvan secured a lead role, Joanna Johnson, in the Australian comedy, caper movie, The Big Steal (1990). Her love-interest, Danny Clarke (portrayed by Ben Mendelsohn), tries to impress her with his car, "[she] agrees to a date. But just as it seems that nirvana is to be easily attained, the motor blows up, along with the date." Mary Colbert of Filmnews observed, "It's first class entertainment; but a little more absurdity in the main characters ([Mendelsohn] and [Karvan]) would not have gone astray... [Karvan],  affable and lovely, has the least developed role in the film – a waste of potential comic conflict."

In 1993 Karvan portrayed a 22-year-old secondary school teacher, Christina Papadopoulos, in The Heartbreak Kid. Her character has an affair with a 17-year-old student, Nick Polides (Alex Dimitriades). Paul Bongiorno, writing for The Canberra Times, observed, "As the lead player Karvan earns much sympathy. Watching her parents and fiancée plan her life, the audience hopes that Christina will stay with Nick." Producer, Ben Gannon, told Bongiorno, "it's such a difficult role. You don't want somebody coming across as a school teacher preying on a young student. She is intelligent. She has a complexity. And you can believe she is Greek." Gannon used the work for the related TV series, Heartbreak High (1994–1999); where Karvan's character of Christine was portrayed by Sarah Lambert.

Karvan starred alongside fellow Australian actor Guy Pearce in Flynn (as My Forgotten Man, 1993) (playing the young fiancée of Errol Flynn) and Dating the Enemy (1996) (where the partners are body swapped). For Flynn shooting had started in 1989, when Karvan was 17, but due to various legal and financial disputes it had to be re-shot with some new cast members, a new director and new producers. By the time Flynn was released to video in 1996, Dating the Enemy had appeared in cinemas, as "a second (much better) movie with Pearce."

Karvan had auditioned for the lead in the comedy film, All Men Are Liars (1995), but did not take it up, which went to fellow actress, Toni Pearen. Pearen recalled "the producer and the director telling me that [Karvan] was their first choice and she actually did a better audition than me. She was my favourite actress and I always had in the back of my mind 'oh my God, Claudia Karvan was better than me, so I have to be really good!'" She worked opposite Hugh Jackman in a romantic comedy, Paperback Hero (1999). In the same year she was nominated for an AFI Award for Best Performance by an Actress in a Supporting Role for the Percy Grainger biopic, Passion. She portrayed Grainger's early love interest, Alfhild de Luce, opposite Richard Roxburgh.

The actress took on the character, Sola Naberrie, in Star Wars: Episode III – Revenge of the Sith (2005), as the older sister of Padmé Amidala (played by Natalie Portman). As Sola she had also filmed scenes for Star Wars: Episode II – Attack of the Clones (2002), but they were cut from the theatrical release and appear only as an extra on the related two-disc DVD. She described working on the 2002 film, "It was one day's work and there was about 10 wardrobe calls for that one day. Amazing outfits. It felt a bit like — whew, this is big! But then you get on the set, and it's an all-Australian crew and it was lovely. I felt comfortable."

In 2006 she took the support role of Alison Berry, a welfare officer, in Footy Legends, a comedy, sports drama about rugby league football. ABC North Queensland's Michael Clarke praised Anh Do and Lisa Saggers in the lead roles, but felt, "The rest of the cast, including [Karvan] and Peter Phelps are merely thin stereotypes, while the casting of real-life footy commentators Andrew Voss and Matthew Johns is painfully embarrassing." She played the role of Ginny Rogers, the mother of teenager, Hailey (Joanna Levesque), in the American teen fantasy, Aquamarine (2006).

Karvan and Steve Bisley were inducted into the Australian Film Walk of Fame in March 2007, "for the skill, expertise and dedication to their craft which has contributed to the vitality and uniqueness of Australian Film, by the placing of plaques in the footpath," in front of the Ritz Cinema, Randwick. Senses of Cinemas Alexandra Heller-Nicholas observed, "Karvan's place as a major player across almost four decades of Australian screen culture was carved in stone." She co-starred with Jim Caviezel in Long Weekend (or Nature's Grave in the United States), directed by Jamie Blanks in February 2008.

In September 2008 she voiced the character of Michelle in $9.99, "a stop motion toon for grown-ups." She appeared in the 2009 film Daybreakers, a vampire thriller co-starring Ethan Hawke and Willem Dafoe and filmed on the Gold Coast. A high-light was, "learning how to handle a crossbow. Her character, Audrey, is a survivor, hiding out alongside Dafoe's Elvis, while Hawke's Edward is a vampire scientist." She also appeared in 33 Postcards (2011) as Barbara, alongside Guy Pearce, again.

Just weeks before shooting began on Infidel (2020), Karvan took over a role from another actress, due to schedule conflicts. Once again, she starred opposite Caviezel as his on-screen wife, "[she] really dove into the part and she portrays the total exasperation a wife would feel when every avenue she pursues to get her husband out of prison is thwarted."

Television

Karvan's early television role, as Amanda, in the teen drama, Princess Kate (1988), placed her supporting Justine Clarke in the title role. During that year she appeared in a TV series, The Last Resort. In 2001 she was asked about working in an ongoing role and reflected, "The only television series I've ever done was at the ABC when I was about 15 – The Last Resort – so you can understand why there was some trepidation."

Karvan took the lead role of Asta Cadell, a motorcycle-riding lawyer, in the telemovie, Natural Justice: Heat (1996), set in York, Western Australia. A critic for Australian Cinema described Karvan's performance, "I do not believe many other Australian actors could pull off the 'biker chick' with such style and beauty." Asta was previously portrayed by Deborra-Lee Furness in the feature film, Shame (1988).

In 1996 Karvan won her first AFI award, Best Actress in a Leading Role in a Television Drama for her portrayal of Jessica Travis in medical drama, G.P., season 8, episode 22, "Sing Me a Lullaby". During the filming of My Brother Jack (2001), Karvan took the role of Cressida Morley, "She's a wonderful character. She's described as having a pagan vitality, as being an authentic savage, and she reminds David (Matt Day) of his brother." She reflected on being cast in a supporting role, "Doing roles that aren't leads doesn't mean it's an inferior job. It's less time and less work but there's something about creating a character for a short period of time: when you don't have the whole telemovie to establish the character and show the arc, you've really got to utilise every second."

In 2001 Karvan starting working on The Secret Life of Us, she took the role of Alex Christensen for its telemovie and the following three of four seasons. Behind the scenes she was also a director on season 3, episodes, "Great Expectations" and "The People You Meet" (both 2003). She acknowledges that show's co-creator and producer, John Edwards for, "her shift from acting in shows to creating... He gave Karvan her first directing gig."

From 2004 she co-starred with Rebecca Gibney in a trilogy of telemovies, Small Claims, Small Claims: White Wedding (2005) and Small Claims: The Reunion (2006). They depict, Jo Collins and Chrissy Hindmarsh, respectively, "a sleuthing duo of down-to-earth women. Karvan is a brisk, unbutch, 30-something policewoman; Gibney is a one-time lawyer, at the cusp of middle age." Gibney explained to Peter Craven of The Age, "when Claudia and I were approached we both insisted that we wanted to play ordinary recognisable women."

Besides acting in a lead role, Karvan was the co-creator, co-producer and a scriptwriter of three seasons of the series, Love My Way (2005–2007). Due to her continuing role as Frankie Paige she won her second AFI award for Best Actress in a Leading Role in a Television Drama in 2005 and her third in 2007 (rebranded as Best Lead Actress in a Television Drama). As a co-producer of Love My Way, Karvan received three further AFI awards, first in 2005 (shared with Edwards), second in 2006 (with Edwards and Jacquelin Perske) and third in 2007 (with Edwards), for Best Television Drama Series. Toby Creswell and Samantha Trenoweth, listed her in their book, 1001 Australians You Should Know (2006), and described how, "[she] has been exploring the highs and lows of fractured family life... She clearly has great range and for the past two years she has starred in and produced the cutting edge drama Love My Way."

The telemovie, Saved (2009), had her depicting Julia, an advocate for a detainee, asylum seeker, Amir (Osamah Sami). In August 2010 Karvan co-created, produced and starred in the series, Spirited. She plays a Sydney dentist, Suzy Darling, who has left her husband Steve (Rodger Corser) and moved into a penthouse in a building, which she discovers is haunted by the ghost of a 1980s British rock musician, Henry (Matt King).

Karvan was cast as Judy Vickers for two seasons of Puberty Blues (2012, 2014). It is inspired the 1981 film of the same name and the related, 1979 novel. She described her perspective, "It's like they're looking at the '70s with 2012 eyes. It's quite unflinching, it's quite detailed... I've never done a period piece of a time that I've lived through – it feels a bit like time travel. It's gorgeous." The actress introduced an Australian Story episode, "Life After Puberty", in September 2012, she reflected on the original film, "The two teenage girls who starred in Puberty Blues looked set for big careers on screen. Tonight's program reveals the bittersweet story of Nell Schofield and her co-star, Jad Capelja."

In the ABC miniseries, The Time Of Our Lives (2013–14), she starred as Caroline Tivolli. Anna Brain of The Herald Sun described the role, "Newly separated and working to resurrect her career, the overly anxious mother of one with tiger-parent tendencies is a divisive character." Brain continued, "Having delved into the character's psyche and found an intelligent, under-utilised woman, Karvan doesn't feel that Caroline would be likely to return the compliment." Also in the show was Justine Clarke as Caroline's co-sister-in-law, Bernadette. Karvan was co-producer of House of Hancock (February 2015), a fictionalised TV drama of the relationship between Gina Rinehart and her step-mother, Rose Porteous. She reflected on the work, "[it's a] story about the legacy of parenting and family (and) she's such an enigmatic and unique character."

In 2016 she starred opposite Pearce in Jack Irish, as his love-interest, Sarah Longmore. Also in that year she co-produced the medical, comedy, drama series, Doctor Doctor (2016–present). Her fellow producers on the show are Tony McNamara and Ian Collie. She had acted to scripts written by McNamara on The Secret Life of Us, Love My Way and Puberty Blues. Karvan and Collie had started collaborating after The Broken Shore, which he had produced. In 2017 she took the titular character, Josephine Newton, in a legal drama, Newton's Law.

Early in 2020 she was a contestant on Dancing with the Stars alongside her professional dance partner, Aric Yegudkin. They finished in third place, despite earning a perfect score, from the judges, in the finale episode, "before viewer votes were added to the mix and dropped her down." She reconnected with Gibney (as Jane Halifax) while portraying her rival, Mandy Petras, in the crime drama series, Halifax: Retribution (2020). The Sydney Morning Heralds Craig Mathieson noticed, "Karvan is the show's best asset, needling Halifax with fake compassion... [her character] is a welcome seam of subtlety, a necessary antidote to the burnt-out cop clichés" of castmate, Anthony LaPaglia as Tom Saracen. Karvan co-created, with Kelsey Munro, and starred in the Australian web television drama series Bump (2021). She also co-produced the series with John Edwards and his son, Dan Edwards.

Stage

In April 1991 Karvan acted in the Shakespearean play, Henry IV, Part 1, at Riverside Theatres in Parramatta. She also appeared as Kathy "Bubba" Ryan in a production of Summer of the Seventeenth Doll at the Seymour Centre, Chippendale, in August of that year. During April 1995 she performed in Poor Super Man, at Wharf 2 Theatre, Sydney. The play was written by Brad Fraser, and was used as the basis for a Canadian drama film, Leaving Metropolis (2002). Karvan acted at Wharf 1 Theatre, in late December 1998, in Fred, a play written by Beatrix Christian. Mark Stoyich of Green Left described the play, "[it] begins as a brittle, fairly funny murder mystery turns into a speculation on the meaning of life, with a bit of sex-farce of the slamming door variety." Her character of Monica is a TV actress, "neurotic, dippy vegetarian ... [who] dresses sexily and throws herself at Detective Rose (John Adam)."

Personal life

Her flatmate while living in Bondi, in the early 1990s, was fellow actress Justine Clarke, the pair had met when they were 8-year-olds. They first acted together on Princess Kate in 1988. Karvan recalled, "We had, like, 10 auditions. It was between Jussie and I. And we lived down the road from each other in Paddington... You can't take those decisions personally, about roles. Right after I got High Tide you got the role I went for, Princess Kate." Karvan was in a relationship with Canadian-born Australian actor, Aden Young, which began in 1993 when both were filmed in Exile (1994), and ended in 1995. They had previously acted together in Broken Highway (1993).

Karvan explained to Ben Holgate of The Sydney Morning Herald, in December 1995, that her acting, "has mostly been intuitive. But comedy and theatre have allowed her to... concentrate on her craft – breathing, movement, thought dialogue... Some picked up from acting courses and much from [Clarke]." She cited her acting heroes as, "Judy Davis, Jessica Lange and Jennifer Jason Leigh." Karvan started salsa dancing as a hobby in 2017 to help with rehabilitation after being treated for a herniated disc. During her stint on Dancing with the Stars in 2020, Karvan dedicated her salsa dance to a childhood friend, Samantha, who had died two years previously.

Karvan first met Jeremy Sparks, an Australian film set constructor and later an engineer, in the late 1980s. They became domestic partners in 1995 and have two children, a daughter Audrey (born 2001), and a son Albee (born 2006). She is also stepmother to pop singer Holiday Sidewinder (born 1990), Sparks' daughter from a previous relationship with Australian actress Lo Carmen. Karvan described Sparks, "When we got together he was a single father, and the way he navigated that really impressed me. He was a great dad then, and now. He's physical and consistent and funny." Karvan (cameo role) and Carmen (as Meryl) had both appeared in a film, The Nostradamus Kid (1993), which was shot in late 1991 and early 1992. Both had previously acted in the TV series, The Last Resort (1988).

In October 2019 Sidewinder, residing in Los Angeles, recalled growing up with Karvan and Sparks, "My stepmother was a famous actress and the bigger breadwinner in my dad's household. Lots of strong women around. I lived on Bondi Beach with dad, surfing and swimming off the rocks at sunset." Audrey Sparks made her acting debut as Little Girl (Young Suzy) in the Spirited episode, "I Remember Nothing" (September 2010). Karvan portrays the adult Suzy Darling and is a co-producer for the series. Audrey reprised her role in season 2 episode, "Time After Time" (July 2011). As of August 2020 the family resided in Redfern, having lived in the area for 15 years.

Filmography

Film

Television

Notes

Awards and nominations 
In 2016, Karvan won the Chauvel Award.

Karvan was awarded the Medal of the Order of Australia (OAM) in the 2023 Australia Day Honours for "service to the film and television industry".

AACTA Awards 

Australian Academy of Cinema and Television Arts Awards, known as the AACTA Awards, are presented annually by the Australian Academy of Cinema and Television Arts (AACTA). They recognise excellence in the film and television industry, both locally and internationally, including the producers, directors, actors, writers, and cinematographers. The awards, previously called Australian Film Institute Awards (or AFI Awards), began in 1958. They were renamed as the AACTA Awards in 2011.

Logie Awards 

The Logie Awards celebrate Australian television, which are sponsored and organized by the industry magazine, TV Week, with the first ceremony in 1959. They are provided in categories representing both public and industry voted awards. Karvan has won the industry voted category, Logie Award for Most Outstanding Actress three times from ten nominations. Her first win was in 2003 for The Secret Life of Us, then in 2006 for Love My Way, and again in 2010 for Saved.

References

External links 

 
 

1972 births
20th-century Australian actresses
21st-century Australian actresses
AACTA Award winners
Actresses from Sydney
Australian child actresses
Australian film actresses
Australian television actresses
Living people
Logie Award winners
People educated at Sydney Church of England Girls Grammar School
Recipients of the Medal of the Order of Australia